Molasses sugar is a dark brown, almost black, moist granular sugar. It can be used interchangeably with muscovado sugar, but molasses sugar has a stronger taste as compared to muscovado. Its distinctive molasses taste is due to its high content of molasses. Nutritively, it has high iron content. Molasses sugar is often used in chutneys, pickles, and marinades, as well as in Christmas cakes.

See also

 Brown sugar
 Sucrose

Sources

Waitrose Sugar Glossary

External links

Molasses
Sugars